Gozzano is a comune (municipality) in the Province of Novara in the Italian region of Piedmont, located about  northeast of Turin and about  northwest of Novara.    
 
Gozzano borders the following municipalities: Bolzano Novarese, Borgomanero, Briga Novarese, Gargallo, Invorio, Orta San Giulio, Pogno, San Maurizio d'Opaglio, and Soriso.

Sport
Gozzano's football team is A.C. Gozzano, founded in 1924 and playing its home games at Stadio Alfredo d'Albertas.

References

External links
 Official website

Gozzano, Italy
Cities and towns in Piedmont